Stephania (died 868) was the wife of Pope Adrian II (r. 867–872).

Stephania married the future Adrian II before he took his vows as a priest  and had a daughter with him. In this time period, it was not yet forbidden for Catholic priests to marry: the celibacy for priests was not introduced until the Second Council of the Lateran in 1139.

Stephania was still alive when Adrian II was elected to Pope in 867. Her position was almost unique. While six Popes in total had been married at some point, Adrian II was likely the only one married during his papacy, while the other appear to have been widowed by the time they became Popes. The last married Pope had been Hormisdas three centuries prior, and he was widowed when he became Pope. The wives of Catholic priests were called by the female version of their husband's title, which would have made Stephania "Popess". Stephania and her daughter lived with the Pope in the Lateran Palace.

The daughter of Adrian II and Stephania married Eleutherius, a relative of the Papal librarian Anastasius Bibliothecarius. However, Eleutherius withheld the fact that he was already married, and thus had committed bigamy when marrying the Pope's daughter. In 868, Stephania and her daughter were abducted by Eleutherius and murdered by him. 
Eleutherius was condemned to death for the abduction and murder. His relative Anastasius Bibliothecarius was accused of having conspired to the abduction and excomunicated.

The abduction and murder of the Pope's wife and daughter attracted a lot of attention and was described in the third part of the famous chronicle Annales Bertiniani by Bishop Hincmar in Pertz, Mon. Germanica vol. 1.

References

 William Cornwallis Cartwright On Papal Conclaves 123
 Alexander Penrose Forbes Articles XXII to end 637
 The Religion of Rome described by a Roman: Authorised translation by William  293
 Richard Wigginton Thompson The Papacy and the Civil Power

868 deaths
9th-century Italian women
Women and the papacy
Papal family members